Nguyễn Phú Trọng (born 14 April 1944) is a Vietnamese politician who has served as the General Secretary of the Communist Party of Vietnam, the country's highest political position, since 2011. In addition, Nguyễn Phú Trọng served as president of Vietnam from 2018 to 2021. As general secretary, Nguyễn Phú Trọng heads the party's secretariat and is the Secretary of the Central Military Commission in addition to being the de facto head of the politburo, the country's highest decision-making body, which currently makes him Vietnam's paramount leader.

He was the Chairman of the National Assembly from 2006 to 2011, representing the constituency of Hanoi. He was elected General Secretary of the Communist Party of Vietnam at the party's 11th National Congress in 2011 and re-elected twice at the 12th National Congress in 2016 and the 13th National Congress in 2021.

On 3 October 2018, following the death of President Trần Đại Quang, the Central Committee of the Communist Party of Vietnam formally nominated Nguyễn Phú Trọng for the presidency, which was voted on at a subsequent session of the National Assembly, where the party holds an overwhelming majority. This made Trọng the third person to simultaneously head the party and state after Hồ Chí Minh (in North Vietnam only) and Trường Chinh. On 23 October 2018, he was elected as the ninth President of Vietnam in a meeting of the sixth session of the National Assembly. Nguyễn Phú Trọng stepped down from the presidency in 2021 but remained head of the Communist Party. In January 2021, Trọng secured a third term as General Secretary, becoming the third leader of Vietnam to do so (the others being Hồ Chí Minh & Lê Duẩn).

Early life and career 

 
Nguyễn Phú Trọng was born in Đông Hội Commune, Đông Anh District. His official biography gives his family background only as "average peasant". He studied philology and earned his Bachelor degree in philology at Vietnam National University, Hanoi from 1963 to 1967. Nguyễn Phú Trọng officially became a member of the Communist Party of Vietnam in December 1968. He worked for the Tạp chí Cộng Sản (Communist Review), the theoretical and political agency of the Communist Party of Vietnam (formerly the Labor Party) in the periods of 1968–1973, 1976–1981 and 1983–1996. From 1973 to 1976, he underwent a political-economic post-graduate course at the High-level Nguyễn Ái Quốc Party School (now the Hồ Chí Minh National Academy of Politics and Public Administration). From 1991 to 1996, he served as the editor-in-chief of the Tạp chí Cộng Sản.
Nguyễn Phú Trọng went to the Soviet Union in 1981 to study at the Academy of Sciences and received a Candidate of Sciences degree in history in 1983. In 1998, Nguyễn Phú Trọng entered the party section devoted to political work, making him one of the most prominent Vietnamese political theoreticians, heading the party Central Committee's Theoretical Council in charge of the party's theoretical work from 2001 to 2006.

Nguyễn Phú Trọng is a Marxist theoretician, and has long railed against some party members' loss of "Marxist-Leninist virtue".

Nguyễn Phú Trọng has been member of the party's Central Committee since January 1994, member of the party's Political Bureau since December 1997 and deputy to the National Assembly since May 2002. From January 2000 to June 2006, Nguyễn Phú Trọng was secretary of the party's Executive Committee of Hanoi, the de facto head of the city authority. On June 26, 2006, Nguyễn Phú Trọng was elected as the Chairman of the National Assembly. During this period, he was elected secretary of the party organization in the National Assembly and member of the Council for Defence and Security. On October 23, 2018, Nguyễn Phú Trọng was elected as the 10th President of the Socialist Republic of Vietnam in a seasonal meeting of National Assembly.

General Secretaryship

First term (2011—16)

Nguyễn Phú Trọng was elected General Secretary of the Communist Party of Vietnam in 2011, making him the top leader of Vietnam. The 5th plenum of the 11th Central Committee decided to take the Central Steering Committee for Anti-Corruption away from the Prime Minister's control and Nguyễn Phú Trọng was elected its head.

On October 11, 2011, he made his first visit to China as General Secretary. According to the VNA, Hu Jintao and Nguyễn Phú Trọng both agreed to avoid complicating the situation in the East Sea and calmly handle disagreements through peaceful negotiations. Vice President of China Xi Jinping came to Vietnam to concretize the results and common perceptions that the leaders of Vietnam - China raised when Mr. Trong came to China during his previous visit in October. In 2015, Mr. Trọng paid a visit to China. According to the VNA, the two leaders emphasized continuing efforts to well implement the motto "friendly neighbourliness, comprehensive cooperation, long-term stability, towards the future."  future" and the spirit of "good neighbours, good friends, good comrades, good partners," always firmly grasping the development direction of Vietnam-China relations.

On 6 July 2015, General Secretary Nguyễn Phú Trọng arrived in the United States to begin his United States visit to July 10, 2015. This visit coincided with the milestone of twenty years since the United States and Vietnam normalized diplomatic relations. The talks with President Barack Obama were about human rights, security and defense and the Trans-Pacific Partnership.

Second term (2016—21)

On 27 January 2016, Nguyễn Phú Trọng was re-elected as General Secretary by the 1st Plenary Session of the 12th Central Committee. At 72 years old, he was the 12th Committee's oldest member. For this term, Nguyễn Phú Trọng is ranked number one in the Politburo, marking a return to normality.

Nguyễn Phú Trọng hopes, under a one-party rule, to strengthen Vietnam's position in the world, turning it into an industrial country rather than a country that produces on primary products. "A country without discipline would be chaotic and unstable [...]. [W]e need to balance democracy and law and order", he said at the close of a meeting to choose the country's leadership for the next five years. "I very much hope the new faces in the politburo will push with reforms and bring the country forward, but I don't know whether they can do that", said Tran Thi Tram. "They will also have to really tackle the corruption problem, otherwise the people would be the ones to suffer most".

On 3 October 2018, Nguyễn Phú Trọng was chosen by the Central Committee of the Communist Party of Vietnam with 100% support to become the party nominee for the position of the President of Vietnam, becoming the official successor of Trần Đại Quang.

The National Assembly elected Nguyễn Phú Trọng as state president on October 23, 2018 with 99.79% percent of the vote. His swearing-in ceremony took place at the Grand Hall and was broadcast live on the afternoon on state radio and television systems.

On 14 April 2019, it was reported that Nguyễn Phú Trọng had been rushed to the Chợ Rẫy Hospital in Ho Chi Minh City after visiting Kiên Giang, according to overseas news sources. He was rumoured to have suffered a stroke. The Vietnamese government initially had no comment on the subject matter, but later confirmed from the Ministry of Foreign Affairs of Vietnam that he was "unwell, but will soon return to work". He reappeared on May 14, 2019 to discuss about the upcoming Party Congress.

Third term (2021—present)

On 31 January 2021, Nguyễn Phú Trọng was re-elected as General Secretary for a third term by the 1st Plenary Session of the 13th Central Committee.

On 1 February 2021, Nguyễn Phú Trọng attended a press conference. Nguyễn Phú Trọng said I am not in great health [...] I am old and I want to rest, but the Congress has elected me so I will comply with my duty to serve as a party member..

The National Assembly on 2 April 2021 voted to relieve Nguyễn Phú Trọng's presidency with 91.25% of the vote. Nguyễn Phú Trọng remains de facto top leader in the country, serving as the General Secretary of the Communist Party.

Personal life 
Nguyễn Phú Trọng is married to Ngô Thị Mân. He has one daughter and one son, both of whom work as Government employees.

Awards 
:
 Friendship Medal (31 October 2022)

:
 Order of José Martí (9 April 2012)

 Communist Party of the Russian Federation:
 Lenin Prize (15 December 2021)

Published works

Books 
 Nguyen Phu Trong (2004). Viet Nam on The Path of Renewal (Việt Nam Trong Tiến Trình Đổi Mới). Hanoi: Thế giới Publishers. 351 p.
 Nguyen Phu Trong (2015). Renewal in Việt Nam: Theory and Reality (Đổi Mới ở Việt Nam: Lý thuyết và thực tiễn). Hanoi: Thế giới Publishers. 397 p.
 Nguyen Phu Trong; Tran Dinh Nghiem; Vu Hien (1995). Vietnam from 1986 (Việt Nam từ năm 1986). Hanoi: Thế giới Publishers. 116 p.

 Nguyen Phu Trong (2019) Determined to prevent and fight corruption (Quyết tâm ngăn chặn và đẩy lùi tham nhũng), Hanoi: Truth National Political Publisher, 380 p.
 Nguyen Phu Trong (2021) Bringing the country into a new phase in a united and confident manner (Đoàn kết, vững tin đưa đất nước bước vào giai đoạn mới), Hanoi: Truth National Political Publisher, 752 p.
 Nguyen Phu Trong (2021) The whole Party and people join hands and unite to build our country more and more prosperous and happy (Toàn Đảng, toàn dân chung sức, đồng lòng xây dựng đất nước ta ngày càng phồn vinh, hạnh phúc). Hanoi: Truth National Political Publisher (2021), 608 p.
 Nguyen Phu Trong (2023) Resolutely and persistently fight against corruption and negativity, contributing to building an increasingly clean and strong Party and State (Kiên quyết, kiên trì đấu tranh phòng, chống tham nhũng, tiêu cực, góp phần xây dựng Đảng và Nhà nước ta ngày càng trong sạch, vững mạnh. Hanoi: Truth National Political Publisher, 600 p.

References

External links 

 Biography of Party General Secretary Nguyen Phu Trong

|-

|-

1944 births
Chairmen of the Standing Committee of the National Assembly (Vietnam)
General Secretaries of the Central Committee of the Communist Party of Vietnam
Living people
Members of the Standing Committee of the 8th Politburo of the Communist Party of Vietnam
Members of the 8th Politburo of the Communist Party of Vietnam
Members of the 9th Politburo of the Communist Party of Vietnam
Members of the 10th Politburo of the Communist Party of Vietnam
Members of the 11th Politburo of the Communist Party of Vietnam
Members of the 12th Politburo of the Communist Party of Vietnam
Members of the 13th Politburo of the Communist Party of Vietnam
Members of the 11th Secretariat of the Communist Party of Vietnam
Members of the 12th Secretariat of the Communist Party of Vietnam
Members of the 13th Secretariat of the Communist Party of Vietnam
Members of the 7th Central Committee of the Communist Party of Vietnam
Members of the 8th Central Committee of the Communist Party of Vietnam
Members of the 9th Central Committee of the Communist Party of Vietnam
Members of the 10th Central Committee of the Communist Party of Vietnam
Members of the 11th Central Committee of the Communist Party of Vietnam
Members of the 12th Central Committee of the Communist Party of Vietnam
Members of the 13th Central Committee of the Communist Party of Vietnam
People from Hanoi
Presidents of Vietnam
Lenin Prize winners